Walewski (plural: Walewscy, feminine form: Walewska) was an influential Polish noble family which originated from Walewice in Łęczyca Land, firstly mentioned in 1382.

History
The family issued 15 senators in the First Polish Republic (1574-1795), one senator of the Polish Kingdom (1819-1831), 4 Knights of the Order of the White Eagle, 4 Knights of the Order of Virtuti Militari in the Napoleonic era and 2 during the November Uprising 1830-31, 1 Knight of Malta and 3 canonesses of Warsaw.

Notable members
 Aleksander Colonna-Walewski (1778-1845), senator
 Aleksander Colonna-Walewski (1810-1868), Polish and French politician, Illegitimate son of Emperor Napoleon I
 Marcin Walewski (died 1761), podkomorzy of Sieradz 
 Maria Walewska, mistress of Emperor Napoleon. In her later years she married count Philippe Antoine d'Ornano.
 Michał Walewski (1735-1806), Voivode of Sieradz
 Władysław Walewski, co-author of the Geographical Dictionary of the Kingdom of Poland
 Wincenty Colonna Walewski, (1841-1896), Count, veteran  of the January Uprising
 Bogumił Gabriel Walewski, cześnik of Sieradz in 1793 roku, member of the Great Sejm

Coat of arms
The coat of arms of the family was Pierzchała.

Residences

References
 Konarski Szymon, Armorial de la noblesse titree polonaise, Paris 1958, s. 336-338.
 Lenczewski Tomasz, Genealogie rodów utytułowanych w Polsce, t. 1, Warszawa 1996-1997, s. 207-212.
 "Szlachta wylegitymowana w Królestwie Polskim w latach 1836-1861". www.szlachta.org.
 Teodor Żychliński: Złota księga szlachty polskiej. T. 5. Poznań: 1883, s. 378.